1218 Aster, provisional designation , is a bright asteroid from the inner regions of the asteroid belt, approximately 5.5 kilometers in diameter. Discovered by Karl Reinmuth in 1932, it was later named after the flowering plant Aster.

Discovery 

Aster was discovered on 29 January 1932, by German astronomer Karl Reinmuth at Heidelberg Observatory in southern Germany. Two nights later, it was independently discovered by Italian astronomer Mario A. Ferrero at the Pino Torinese Observatory at Turin, Italy.

Classification and orbit 

Aster orbits the Sun in the inner main-belt at a distance of 2.0–2.5 AU once every 3 years and 5 months (1,244 days). Its orbit has an eccentricity of 0.11 and an inclination of 3° with respect to the ecliptic.

The asteroid's observation arc begins at the discovering observatory, one week after its official discovery observation.

Physical characteristics

Diameter and albedo 

According to the survey carried out by the NEOWISE mission of NASA's Wide-field Infrared Survey Explorer, Aster measures 5.554 kilometers in diameter and its surface has an albedo of 0.332.

Lightcurves 

As of 2017, rotational lightcurve of Aster has been obtained. The body's rotation period, shape and variation in magnitude shifted from unknown movements to specific identifiable spin/shape determinations.

Naming 

The minor planet was named after the genus of flowers, Aster (also see ). The official naming citation was mentioned in The Names of the Minor Planets by Paul Herget in 1955.

References

External links 
 Asteroid Lightcurve Database (LCDB), query form (info )
 Dictionary of Minor Planet Names, Google books
 Asteroids and comets rotation curves, CdR – Observatoire de Genève, Raoul Behrend
 Discovery Circumstances: Numbered Minor Planets (1)-(5000) – Minor Planet Center
 
 

001218
Discoveries by Karl Wilhelm Reinmuth
Named minor planets
19320129